Charlie Bracken (born 9 December 2003) is an English rugby union footballer who played at scrum-half for Saracens RFC and England national under-20 rugby union team. He is the son of former England scrum-half Kyran Bracken.

Career
Bracken chose Barnet Rugby Club as his first club. He joined Saracens RFC aged fourteen, and progressed through the age groups and made his senior debut in the Premiership Cup against Wasps RFC in March 2022.

International career
In February 2022 he was called up to a England under-18 training camp held in Bisham Abbey. In the summer of 2022 he made four appearances for the England U20 team. In January 2023 he was named in the England U20 squad for the Under-20 Six Nations Championship. Footage of Bracken giving away his shirt to a young fan at the conclusion of the clash between England and Scotland was reported as going viral.

Personal life
The son of former England rugby Union international Kyran Bracken and his wife Victoria, Charlie has two younger brothers Jack and Lachlan. They were brought up in Hadley Wood. He completed his A-levels at St. Albans School and then attended Loughborough University.

References

 2003 births
Living people
Saracens F.C. players
Rugby union scrum-halves
English rugby union players 
Sportspeople from St Albans 
People educated at St Albans School, Hertfordshire
People from Hadley Wood